DZRR may refer to:

DZRR, a defunct radio station in Baguio owned and operated by ABS-CBN Corporation.
DZRR-TV, a defunct television station in Dagupan owned and operated by ABS-CBN Corporation.